Cuauhtémoc Cárdenas Solórzano (born 1 May 1934) is a prominent Mexican politician. The son of 51st President of Mexico Lázaro Cárdenas, he is a former Head of Government of Mexico City and a founder of the Party of the Democratic Revolution. He ran for the presidency of Mexico three times, and his 1988 loss to the Institutional Revolutionary Party candidate Carlos Salinas de Gortari had long been considered a direct result of obvious electoral fraud perpetrated by the ruling PRI, later acknowledged by President Miguel de la Madrid. He previously served as a Senator, having been elected in 1976 to represent the state of Michoacán and also as the Governor of Michoacán from 1980 to 1986.

Early life and career
Cárdenas Solórzano was born in Mexico City on 1 May 1934 and was named after the last Aztec emperor, Cuauhtémoc. He is the only son of Lázaro Cárdenas and Amalia Solórzano. When he was seven months old, his father was inaugurated as President of Mexico. He studied at Colegio Williams, an all-boys private, secular English-language school that has a rigorous academic curriculum. The school is located in the old mansion of Porfirio Díaz's finance minister, José Yves Limantour. An alumnus described the education there as cultivating "the body as a source of energy and fighting. It was an energy destined to produce active, intelligent animals of prey. [The school] worshiped manly virtues like tenacity, strength, loyalty and aggression."

Cuauhtémoc Cárdenas often served as his father's aide-de-camp in later years, when the former president remained a powerful political figure.  Lázaro Cárdenas remained active in Institutional Revolutionary Party politics, and, with son Cuauhtémoc, tried to move the party to a more leftist stance.  Both were active in the Movimiento de Liberación Nacional (MLN, Movement of National Liberation), which sought international support for Cuba following its 1959 revolution, as well as to affect domestic politics in Mexico, particularly the need for democracy in the PRI and decentralization of power.

Cuauhtémoc Cárdenas served as a senator for the state of Michoacán from 1974 to 1980 and as governor of that same state from 1980 to 1986. He won election to these two posts as a member of the then-ruling Institutional Revolutionary Party.

When President Miguel de la Madrid, a centrist who began policy changes in Mexico that liberalized its economy, designated his presidential successor as Carlos Salinas de Gortari, another technocrat with centre-right tendencies, leftist and other elements within the PRI formed a "democratic current." They demanded democracy and a return to a more moderate, anti-privatization stance by the PRI. Cárdenas and Porfirio Muñoz Ledo led this current. There was an informal rule within the PRI called "el dedazo," the incumbent president's unwritten and exclusive right to designate his successor. (The expression was a reference to the action of pointing with a finger to the successor.) With the designation of Salinas as the official candidate, the democratic current were forced out of the PRI. In an interview with historian Enrique Krauze, De la Madrid said "as far as I'm concerned, let them go! Let them form another party." It was too late to form a new party in advance of the July 1988 elections, but a coalition of small left-wing parties, the Frente Democrático Nacional (National Democratic Front) supported Cárdenas as their candidate.

On 6 July 1988, the day of the elections, a system shutdown of the IBM AS/400 that the government was using to count the votes occurred. The government simply stated that se cayó el sistema ("the system crashed"), to refer to the incident.  When the system was finally restored, Carlos Salinas was declared the official winner. The elections became extremely controversial, and even though some declare that Salinas won legally, the expression se cayó el sistema became a colloquial euphemism for electoral fraud. It was the first time in 59 years, from the creation of PRI to that point (1929–1988), that the winning of the presidency by that party was in doubt, and the citizens of Mexico realized that PRI could lose. Historian Enrique Krauze's assessment is that "an order from [Cárdenas] would have sent Mexico up in flames. But perhaps in memory of his father, the missionary general, a man of strong convictions but not a man of violence, he did the country a great service by sparing it a possible civil war."

The following year (5 May 1989), Cárdenas and other leading center-left and leftist PRI politicians, including Francisco Arellano-Belloc, formally founded the Party of the Democratic Revolution (PRD). He was elected the PRD's first president, running unopposed, and had a huge influence on the Executive Board's composition.  The party had the expectation that Cárdenas would make another run for the presidency in 1994 and he was this new party's candidate in the 1994 presidential election. He placed third, trailing the PRI and PAN candidates, with 17% of the national vote. That election year was tumultuous, with the rebellion of the Zapatista Army of National Liberation in Chiapas beginning 1 January, the assassination of the PRI candidate Luis Donaldo Colosio in March, and his replacement as presidential candidate by Ernesto Zedillo.  Cárdenas's poor showing at the polls may reflect the Mexican public's desire for stability via the long-time ruling party remaining in office. In the assessment of Enrique Krauze, "the events in Chiapas probably cost the PRD and its candidate, Cuauhtémoc Cárdenas—who had no involvement with the Zapatista uprising—the votes of many Mexicans uneasy with the return of the past." Despite the PRD's electoral results, they were part of the 1996 negotiations between the PRI and the conservative National Action Party (PAN) on institutional reform.

In 1995, Cárdenas played a role in the peace negotiations with the Zapatistas. In 1996, the PRD was choosing a new party president, Cárdenas's ally Andrés Manuel López Obrador, who went further and sought a political alliance with the Zapatistas.

In 1997, he was the PRD's candidate for the newly created post of Head of Government (Jefe de Gobierno) of the Federal District – effectively, a role lying somewhere between that of Mexico City's mayor and a state governorship. He won this election, held on 6 July 1997, with a 47.7% share of the popular vote.

He resigned in 1999 (and was succeeded by one of his allies, Rosario Robles), to run for the presidency again in 2000.  Cárdenas  again placed third with 17% of the vote and the PRI lost the election to Vicente Fox, the candidate of the PAN.

On 25 November 2014, Cárdenas announced that he was leaving the PRD. He had been a longtime senior member of the PRD, and was considered the 'moral leader' of this party. Many in Mexico see his departure from the PRD as a product of the party's internal fighting and mounting identity crisis.

Personal life
Cárdenas Solórzano was reported to test positive for COVID-19 on 12 September 2020.

Further reading
 Aguilar Zinser, Adolfo. Vamos a ganar! La pugna de Cuauhtémoc Cárdenas por el poder. Mexico City: Editorial Oceano 1995.
 Bruhn, Kathleen. Taking on Goliath: The Emergence of a New Left Party and the Struggle for Democracy in Mexico. University Park: Pennsylvania State University Press 1997.
 Carr, Barry and Steve Ellner, editors. The Left in Latin America: From the fall of Allende to Perestroika. Boulder CO: Westview Press 1993.
 Castañeda, Jorge. Utopia Unarmed: The Latin American Left after the Cold War. New York: Knopf 1993.
 Gilly, Adolfo, ed. Cartas a Cuauhtémoc Cárdenas. Mexico City: Era 1989.
 Taibo, Paco Ignacio II. Cárdenas de cerca: Una entrevista biográfica. Mexico City: Editorial Planeta 1994.

References

External links
PBS: Charles Krause interviews Cuauhtémoc Cárdenas
 Biography on Televisa's website.
 Government of the Mexican Federal District: Cuauhtémoc Cárdenas.
 Cuauhtémoc Cárdenas Solórzano, A progressive proposal.
 https://web.archive.org/web/20141208150646/http://www.laprensasa.com/309_america-in-english/2814492_cuauhtemoc-cardenas-leaves-mexico-s-prd.html

|-

|-

1935 births
Living people
People from Mexico City
Mexican democracy activists
Governors of Michoacán
Heads of Government of Mexico City
Mexican engineers
Candidates in the 1988 Mexican presidential election
Candidates in the 1994 Mexican presidential election
Candidates in the 2000 Mexican presidential election
Members of the Senate of the Republic (Mexico)
Mexican people of Basque descent
Presidents of the Party of the Democratic Revolution
National Autonomous University of Mexico alumni
Recipients of the Order of the Liberator General San Martin

Institutional Revolutionary Party politicians
Children of presidents of Mexico
Mexican social democrats
20th-century Mexican politicians